Salim Hussein  (born 17 December 1969) is an Iraqi former football defender who played for Iraq at the 1989 FIFA World Youth Championship.

Salim made 12 appearances for the national team between 1989 and 1993.

References

Iraqi footballers
Iraq international footballers
Living people
Association football defenders
1969 births